For the metro station formerly known as Middle Henan Road Station, see East Nanjing Road (Shanghai Metro)

Henan Road is a major thoroughfare in Huangpu District, Shanghai.

Sections
Running in a north–south direction, the road is divided into three sections:

 North Henan Road
 Middle Henan Road (to a lesser extent: Central Henan Road), crossing Nanjing Road pedestrian street, an important shopping street of Shanghai, and Suzhou Creek. The road was formerly romanized as Honan Road and prior to that as Barrier Road, since it was located along the initial western boundary of the International Settlement of Shanghai.
 South Henan Road

Transportation
 East Nanjing Road station of the Shanghai Metro is located at the intersection of Henan and East Nanjing Roads.

References

Streets in Shanghai
Huangpu District, Shanghai